Anschütz is a German surname, which may also appear as Anschutz, without the umlaut. It may refer to:

People

Entertainment
Heinrich Anschütz (1785–1865), German actor
Karl Anschütz (  1814 – 1870), German-born musical director in New York City

Science
Georg Anschütz (1886–1953), German psychologist
Hermann Anschütz-Kaempfe (1872–1931), German scientist
Richard Anschütz (1852–1937), German chemist

Sports
Daniela Anschütz-Thoms (born 1974), German speed skater
Helmut Anschütz (1932–2016), German fencer
Jody Anschutz (born 1962), American professional golfer

Other people
Ernst Anschütz (1780–1861), German teacher
Gerhard Anschütz (1867–1948), German teacher of constitutional law
Hermann Anschütz (1802–1880), German painter and professor
Joseph Anschutz, American architect
Ottomar Anschütz (1846–1907), German inventor, photographer and chronophotographer
Philip Anschutz (born 1939), American entrepreneur
Sue Anschutz-Rodgers (born 1936), American rancher, conservationist, and philanthropist
Wendall Anschutz (1938–2010), American television newsman

Companies
The Anschutz Corporation, an American private holding company
Anschutz Entertainment Group, a subsidiary of The Anschutz Corporation
Anschutz Family Foundation, a private foundation based in Denver, Colorado, U.S.
J. G. Anschütz, a German firearms manufacturer
Raytheon Anschütz, a German marine navigation company

Other uses
Anschütz 1827 Fortner, a popular biathlon rifle
Anschutz Medical Campus, in Aurora, Colorado, U.S.
Philip F. Anschutz Trophy, awarded to winners of the MLS Cup in Major League Soccer

See also
 
Thomas Pollock Anshutz (1851–1912), American painter and teacher

German-language surnames
North German surnames